Monto  is a rural town and locality in the North Burnett Region, Queensland, Australia.

Geography

The Gladstone–Monto Road intersects with the Burnett Highway in the town.

The main street in the town is Newton Street.

History
Gureng Gureng (also known as Gooreng Gooreng, Goreng Goreng, Goeng, Gurang, Goorang Goorang, Korenggoreng) is an Australian Aboriginal language spoken by the Gureng Gureng people. The Gooreng Gooreng language region includes the towns of Bundaberg, Gin Gin and Miriam Vale extending south towards Childers, inland to Monto and Mt Perry.

The town takes its name from its railway station, which in turn is an Aboriginal word meaning ridgy plain.

Europeans settled in the area in the late 1840s, maintaining large pastoral holdings at the northern end of the Burnett Valley. Gold unearthed along Three Moon Creek — a tributary of the Burnett River — in the 1870s attracted further settlers.

The township of Monto was not formally established until 1924 in which year the post office opened.

Norton Diggings Provisional School opened circa 1881 and is believed to have been repositioned circa 1892 and renamed Norton Goldfield Provisional School. It closed circa 1903 but reopened in 1904 as Norton Provisional School, but then closed in 1907.

Monto State School opened on 25 January 1926.

Monto Baptist Church opened on 23 April 1930. It was at 24 Kelvin Street. It closed in 1997 and passed into private ownership.

St Therese's Catholic Primary School was opened on 5 February 1940 by the Presentation Sisters.

With dwindling gold reserves, Monto turned its economy towards farming and logging, two of the region's major industries today. Deposits of thermal coal and limestone have been discovered in the shire.

Monto State High School opened on 28 January 1964.

The town was the administrative centre of Monto Shire until its amalgamation in 2008 into the new North Burnett Region local government area.

Amenities

Monto has a cultural and historical complex with a museum reserve, sporting facilities, swimming pool and golf club.

Monto Hospital is a 14-bed hospital operated by Queensland Health at 35 Flinders Street. It has a 24-hour emergency service.

The North Burnett Regional Council operates a public library in Monto at 50 Newton Street.

The Monto-Bancroft branch of the Queensland Country Women's Association meets at 9 Rutherford Street.

Education 
Monto State School is a government primary (Prep-6) school for boys and girls at 3 Leichhardt Street. In 2017, the school had an enrolment of 110 students with 9 teachers (7 full-time equivalent) and 11 non-teaching staff (5 full-time equivalent).

Monto State High School is a government secondary (7-12) school for boys and girls at Mouatt Street. In 2017, the school had an enrolment of 159 students with 23 teachers (20 full-time equivalent) and 19 non-teaching staff (11 full-time equivalent).

Monto Cluster Special Education Program is a primary and secondary (Prep-12) special education program at Monto State High School.

St Therese's Catholic Primary School is a Catholic primary (Prep-6) school for boys and girls at Rayleigh Street. In 2017, the school had an enrolment of 88 students with 9 teachers (8 full-time equivalent) and 3 non-teaching staff (2 full-time equivalent).

Heritage listings
Monto has a number of heritage-listed sites, including:

 Gladstone-Monto Road: Monto Cemetery No 1 and No 2
 corner of Huxley, Bell & Edison Streets: Monto Watertower and Rotary Park
 Lister, Kelvin, Lyell & Faraday Streets: Monto Town Design (also known as Monto Government Administration Precinct)
 Newton Street: Hotel Albert
 Newton Street: Monto Shire Hall
 53 Newton Street: former Monto Court House
 Rutherford Street: former Monto Council Office and Chambers (also known as Sunshine House)
 corner Rutherford and Newton Streets: Monto Post Office
 Yarrol Road, Ventnor: Ventnor State School

Tourism
Tourism is also a major industry in the region.

Monto has also added to its attractions as being the most northerly silo art installation in Australia. Its "Three Moons" silos depict several stories of the past, including the era of gold mining, cattle mustering and The Dreaming. It also has a mural on an old water tower.

Dairy farming
Monto was once the centre of a thriving dairy industry, with more than 400 dairy farms in the area, but deregulation in the 1990s changed that. The number of dairy farms dropped to three.

Mining
In 2006, Monto Minerals floated on the Alternative Investment Market in London, raising approximately A$41 million before expenses. In 2007 it announced plans to begin commercial production of feldspar, ilmenite, apatite and titanomagnetite from its site at the Goondicum crater, just outside the eastern border of Monto Shire. It was reported in September 2008 that Monto Minerals had placed itself in voluntary administration. The mine was then operated by Belridge Enterprises from September 2012 to June 2013, and Melior Resources from April to July 2015 when production was halted due to low market prices. After resuming operations the mine was again closed when Melior Resources appointed a voluntary administrator in September 2019.

Coal mining company Macarthur Coal also owns large amounts of land in the Mulgildie area.

Climate

Notable people from Monto 

 Gordon Bennett (artist)
 Michael Caton
 Prof. Megan Davis was born here in 1975.
 Gil Jamieson
 Mal Meninga
 Jeff Seeney
 Mark Steketee
 Daphne Seeney

See also
 Shire of Monto
 The Boyne Valley
 Cania Gorge National Park

References

External links

 
 Town map of Monto, 1981
Monto Shire Council
Monto: The Age newspaper write-up (includes historical information)
Monto Online

Monto
Populated places established in 1924
North Burnett Region
1924 establishments in Australia
Localities in Queensland